Arșița may refer to several villages in Romania:

 Arșița, a village in Măgura Ilvei Commune, Bistrița-Năsăud County
 Arșița, a village in Hodac Commune, Mureș County
 Arșița, a village in Bogdana Commune, Vaslui County
 Arșița, a village in Andreiașu de Jos Commune, Vrancea County
 Arșița, the Romanian name for Arshytsia village, Nyzhni Petrivtsi Commune, Storozhynets Raion, Ukraine

See also 
 Arșița River (disambiguation)
 Arsuri (disambiguation)